Solitaire is the thirty-first studio album by American pop singer Andy Williams, released in the fall of 1973 by Columbia Records and was an attempt to move away from his formulaic series of recent releases that relied heavily on songs that other artists had made popular.

The album made its first appearance on Billboard magazine's Top LPs & Tapes chart in the issue dated November 17, 1973, and remained there for six weeks, peaking at number 185. It entered the UK album chart the following month, on December 22, and stayed there for 26 weeks, during which time it made it all the way to number three.  On January 1, 1974, the newly formed British Phonographic Industry awarded the album with Silver certification for sales of 60,000 units in the UK, and Gold certification from the BPI, for sales of 100,000 units, followed on January 1, 1975.

The first single from the album was the title track, which entered Billboard'''s list of the 40 most popular Easy Listening songs of the week in the U.S. in the issue dated October 6, 1973, and stayed on the chart for nine weeks, peaking at number 23.  Although the song did not make the magazine's Hot 100, it did make the top five in the UK, where it entered the singles chart two months later, on December 8, and reached number four during an 18-week stay.  Williams's rerecording of another song from the album, "Remember", as a duet with his daughter Noelle resulted in another Easy Listening chart entry as of the January 5, 1974, issue that made it to number 30 over the course of seven weeks.  A third song, "Getting over You", entered the UK singles chart four months later, on May 18, and lasted there five weeks, eventually getting to number 35.Solitaire was released on compact disc for the first time as one of two albums on one CD by Collectables Records on February 19, 2002, the other album being Williams's Columbia release from the fall of 1972, Alone Again (Naturally).  Collectables included this CD in a box set entitled Classic Album Collection, Vol. 2, which contains 15 of his studio albums and two compilations and was released on November 29, 2002. Solitaire was paired with the UK version of Alone Again (Naturally) (which was entitled The First Time Ever (I Saw Your Face)) as two albums on one CD by Sony Music Distribution in 2003.

History

In 1966 Williams began to shift the focus of the material he recorded for his studio projects for Columbia Records away from traditional pop by recording the Beatles ballads "Michelle" and "Yesterday" for his album The Shadow of Your Smile. Covers of contemporary pop hits edged out his usual album fare of standards completely with the release of his 1968 album Honey and would dominate his LPs into the early 1970s.

Williams justified his latest decision to change his way of selecting music to record in an interview with Billboard in 1973. "'Middle of the Road music has changed drastically in the past two years,' says Williams. 'Easy Listening radio now plays predominantly the softer new rock records, not cover versions by MOR artists. My Columbia albums of hit covers have all made money, but I feel it's time for me to move along with the market.'" The magazine's editor Nat Freedland wrote, "The total sound of the Solitaire LP is not drastically different from other Williams albums; pretty ballads and lush string backgrounds are still much in evidence. The most obvious differences are a new concentration on strong rhythm instrument core and predominance of previously unrecorded songs."

The singer also took on a new approach to recording the album. "Williams, who generally has never recorded his vocals until the entire instrumental tracks were finished, here found himself singing along with the all-star rock session men putting down his basic rhythm tracks. 'I think everybody agrees now that you get better results when the artist sings along with the rhythm track sessions, even if you erase the vocal track afterwards,' says Williams. Ever the perfectionist, Andy wound up taping new vocals over the finished instrumental tracks. 'I just felt I could do it a bit better than I did at the live sessions,' he explains."

Reception

William Ruhlmann of Allmusic took note of the new Williams sound. "One doesn't usually think of Andy Williams as someone ahead of the curve in popular music trends, but in 1973 he anticipated the comeback of Neil Sedaka by recording the songwriter's tune 'Solitaire' and using it as the title track and lead single of an album. Unfortunately, getting out in front of fashions is as commercially dicey as falling behind them, and while Sedaka himself went on to commercial resurgence in 1974 and "Solitaire" became a hit for the Carpenters in 1975, Williams did not benefit from his prescience (except in the UK, where his version made the Top Five)."

Ruhlmann also points out the logic behind the change in format. "With his record sales falling, Williams did not make a spring album in 1973, waiting until the fall to issue Solitaire, on which he not only cut his interpretations of recent pop hits ('You Are the Sunshine of My Life,' 'My Love') but also worked a little harder at song selection, resurrecting the Everly Brothers oldie 'Walk Right Back' and covering LP tracks by George Harrison ('That Is All') and Nicky Hopkins ('The Dreamer'). There was also an excellent movie song, 'Last Tango in Paris,' with lyrics by Dory Previn. In keeping with the tone of the title track, the arrangements and Williams's tone tended to emphasize melancholy, so that even 'You Are the Sunshine of My Life' sounded somewhat sad." Ruhlmann concludes, "Solitaire was a cut above most Andy Williams albums, but commercially that didn't matter. The singer had not found a way to reverse his career decline, and the album barely grazed the charts."

Track listing

This is the first Williams album that credits the musicians involved (with the exception of Lincoln Mayorga, credited on one track, God Only Knows, on the 1967 album Love, Andy), and they are listed on the back cover of the LP with each track as follows:

Side one
 "Solitaire" (Phil Cody, Neil Sedaka) - 4:22
 Jim Keltner - drums
 Lincoln Mayorga - piano
 Jim Ryan - acoustic guitar
 Tom Hensley - harpsichord
 Red Rhodes - pedal steel guitar
 Lyle Ritz - bass
 Kirby Johnson - string and woodwind arrangement
 "Make It Easy for Me" (Peter Skellern) - 3:12
Nicky Hopkins - piano
Louie Shelton - acoustic guitar
Vini Poncia - acoustic guitar
Klaus Voormann - bass
Hal Blaine - drums
Bud Shank - alto sax solo
Tom Scott - arrangement 
 "You Are the Sunshine of My Life" (Stevie Wonder) - 3:11
Jim Keltner - drums
Joe Osborn - bass
Jimmy Calvert - electric guitar
Vini Poncia - acoustic guitar
John Morrell - acoustic guitar
Billy Fender - acoustic guitar
Tom Hensley - piano and choral arrangement
Tom Scott - string, horn and woodwind arrangement
Chuck Findley - flugelhorn solo
 "Getting Over You" (Tony Hazzard) - 3:23
Klaus Voormann - bass
Jim Keltner - drums
Jimmy Calvert - electric guitar
Vini Poncia - acoustic guitar
Billy Fender - acoustic guitar
John Morrell - acoustic guitar
Tom Hensley - piano, string and horn arrangement
 "Remember" (Harry Nilsson) - 4:03
Nicky Hopkins - piano
Richard Bennett - acoustic guitar
John Morrell - mandolin
Tom Hensley - harpsichord
Gene Page - string arrangement

Side two
 "That Is All" (George Harrison) - 4:28
Jim Keltner - drums
Klaus Voormann - bass
Nicky Hopkins - piano
Tom Hensley - piano
Jimmy Calvert - electric guitar
Gene Page - string and vocal arrangement
 "Walk Right Back" (Sonny Curtis) - 3:10
Klaus Voormann - bass
Jim Keltner - drums
Tom Hensley - electric piano
Vini Poncia - acoustic guitar
Jimmy Calvert - acoustic and electric guitar
John Morrell - acoustic guitar
Tom Scott - string and horn arrangement
 "Last Tango in Paris" from Last Tango in Paris (Gato Barbieri, Dory Previn) - 2:38
Hal Blaine - drums
Lyle Ritz - bass
Mike Lang - electric piano
Ben Benay - acoustic guitar
Clark Gassman - piano
Mike Deasy - electric guitar
Gene Cipriano - bass clarinet solo
Kirby Johnson - string arrangement
 "My Love" (Linda McCartney, Paul McCartney) - 4:00
Jim Keltner - drums
Joe Osborn - bass
Jimmy Calvert - electric guitar
Vini Poncia - acoustic guitar
John Morrell - acoustic guitar
Billy Fender - acoustic guitar
Tom Hensley - electric piano, string and woodwind arrangement
 "The Dreamer" (Nicky Hopkins) - 5:08
Nicky Hopkins - piano
Klaus Voormann - bass
Jim Keltner - drums
Vini Poncia - acoustic guitar
John Morrell - acoustic guitar
Billy Fender - acoustic guitar
Lon Van Eaton - percussion
Derek Van Eaton - percussion
Tom Hensley - choral arrangement 
Del Newman - string and horn arrangement

Song information

"Walk Right Back" by The Everly Brothers reached number seven on the Billboard Hot 100, and their run on the UK singles chart that paired the song with "Ebony Eyes" included three weeks in the number one position. "Solitaire" first appeared on Neil Sedaka's 1972 UK album of the same name but did not make the charts until the Williams version was released the following year. Stevie Wonder's recording of "You Are the Sunshine of My Life" reached number one pop, number one Easy Listening, number three R&B, and number seven on the UK singles chart. "Last Tango in Paris" entered the Billboardcharts as an instrumental recording by Herb Alpert & The Tijuana Brass that reached number 77 pop and number 22 Easy Listening.  "My Love" earned Paul McCartney & Wings four weeks in the top spot on the Hot 100, three weeks at number one Easy Listening, a number nine hit on the UK singles chart, and Gold certification by the Recording Industry Association of America.

In 1973 Herman's Hermits lead singer Peter Noone released "Getting over You" as a single, and a trio of albums featured recordings of some of the lesser-known songs here: "Remember" was first sung by Johnny Mathis on Me and Mrs. Jones; George Harrison's "That Is All" was included on Living in the Material World; and "The Dreamer" was recorded by its composer/lyricist, Nicky Hopkins, for The Tin Man Was a Dreamer. "Make It Easy for Me" was eventually recorded by its composer/lyricist, Peter Skellern, for his 1975 album Hold On to Love, which also featured the song "My Lonely Room", which Williams later recorded for his 1976 album Andy''.

Personnel
From the liner notes for the original album:

Ben Benay - acoustic guitar
Richard Bennett - acoustic guitar
Hal Blaine - drums
Jimmy Calvert - electric guitar, acoustic guitar
Gene Cipriano - bass clarinet
Mike Deasy - electric guitar
Billy Fender - acoustic guitar
Chuck Findley - flugelhorn
Clark Gassman - piano
Tom Hensley - arranger; harpsichord, piano, electric piano
Nicky Hopkins - piano
Kirby Johnson - arranger
Jim Keltner - drums
Michael Lang - electric piano
Lincoln Mayorga - piano
John Morrell - acoustic guitar, mandolin
Del Newman - arranger
Joe Osborn - bass
Gene Page - arranger
Richard Perry - producer
Vini Poncia - acoustic guitar
Red Rhodes - pedal steel guitar
Lyle Ritz - bass
Jim Ryan - acoustic guitar
Bill Schnee - engineer
Tom Scott - arranger
Bud Shank - alto sax solo
Louie Shelton - acoustic guitar
Derek Van Eaton - percussion
Lon Van Eaton - percussion
Klaus Voormann - bass
Andy Williams - vocals

Charts

References

Bibliography

1973 albums
Andy Williams albums
Albums arranged by Gene Page
Albums produced by Richard Perry
Columbia Records albums